Antrim Short (July 11, 1900 – November 24, 1972) was an American stage and film actor, casting director and talent agent. As a juvenile he enjoyed some success on the Broadway stage, notably appearing as a boy with Mrs. Fiske and Holbrook Blinn in Salvation Nell in 1908. While in his teens he appeared in silent films playing the kind of roles that were made popular by Jack Pickford.

Short was born to two actors, Lew and Estella Short, and his sister was silent actresses Gertrude Short. They were cousins of Blanche Sweet. Short was married to Frances Morris, who is best remembered by tv fans as George Reeves's Earth mother Sarah Kent in The Adventures of Superman.

Short died in Los Angeles November 24, 1972.

Partial filmography

Bobby's Baby (1913) *short
Why Rags Left Home (1913) *short
The Fallen Angel (1913) *short
The Village Blacksmith (1913) *short
His Brand (1913) *short
Chivalry Days (1913) *short
The Kid (1913) *short
The Buccaneers (1913) *short
John Barleycorn (1914) *short
Some Boy (1914) *short
The Test (1914) *short
The Fruit of Evil (1914) *short
Jess of the Mountain Country (1914)
Where the Trail Divides (1914)
Jack Chanty (1915)
The Old Tutor (1915) *short
The Weird Nemesis (1915) *short
The Cry of the First Born (1915) *short
The Gambler of the West (1915)
Mammy's Rose (1916) *short
Dolly's Scoop (1916) *short
Life's Harmony (1916) *short
The Windward Anchor (1916) *short
The Flirt (1916) *short
There Is No Place Like Home (1916)
Nancy's Birthright (1916)
Corporal Billy's Comeback (1916) *short
The Valley of Beautiful Things (1917) *short
The Boyhood He Forgot (1917) *short
Tom Sawyer (1917)
 A Jewel in Pawn (1917)
Pride and the Man (1917)
Rebecca of Sunnybrook Farm (1917)A Petticoat Pilot (1918)Cupid by Proxy (1918)Huck and Tom (1918)
 The Yellow Dog (1918)
 The Narrow Path (1918)Amarilly of Clothes-Line Alley (1918)Hugon, The Mighty (1918)Romance and Arabella (1919)Destiny (1919)The Thunderbolt (1919)
 Please Get Married (1919)The Right of Way (1920)Fighting Cressy (1920)Old Lady 31 (1920)
 The Son of Wallingford (1921)Rich Girl, Poor Girl (1921)O'Malley of the Mounted (1921)Beauty's Worth (1922)Classmates (1924)Wildfire (1925)The Pinch Hitter (1925)Married ? (1926)
 The Broadway Boob (1926)Jack O'Hearts (1926)The Big Shakedown (1934) *(uncredited)Wings in the Dark (1935) *(uncredited)College Scandal (1935)Redheads on Parade (1935) *(uncredited)She Couldn't Take It (1935) *(uncredited)The Milky Way (1936) *(uncredited)Mr. Deeds Goes to Town (1936) *(uncredited)The Moon's Our Home (1936) *(uncredited)The Case Against Mrs. Ames (1936) *(uncredited)Rose Bowl (1936) *(uncredited)The Big Show (1936)The Devil is Driving (1937) *(uncredited)Exclusive (1937)It's All Yours (1937) *(uncredited)Artists & Models (1937) *(uncredited)Ebb Tide'' (1937) *(uncredited)

References

External links

1900 births
1972 deaths
Male actors from Cincinnati
Actors from Ohio
People from Ohio
American male silent film actors
20th-century American male actors